Joe Mabon (13 February 1874 – 2 June 1945) was a Scotland international rugby union player. He played as a Half-back.

Mabon was described as 'for many years one of the brightest stars in Border and Scottish rugby'.

Rugby Union career

Amateur career

He played for Jedburgh RFC.

Provincial career

Mabon played for the South of Scotland in 1898.

International career

He was capped 4 times for Scotland from 1898 to 1900.

Outside of rugby

Mabon was an auctioneer. He was secretary of the Jedforest Agricultural Society; and a well known Jedhart Callant, a member of the Callants Club.

References

1874 births
1945 deaths
Rugby union players from Jedburgh
Scottish rugby union players
Scotland international rugby union players
South of Scotland District (rugby union) players